Bian er chai is an anthology of homoerotic short stories by an unknown author published in the late Ming dynasty.

Contents 
Bian er chai comprises four short stories that revolve around homosexual relationships; each story is five chapters long. "Qingzhen ji" or "A Story of Chaste Love" follows a member of the Hanlin Academy who poses as a student to seduce a boy; in "Qingxia ji" or "A Story of Chivalric Love", a decorated soldier is seduced by a man; "Qinglie ji" or "A Story of Sacrificing Love" explores the love life of a young male opera singer; and in "Qingqi ji" or "A Story of Extraordinary Love", a young catamite is rescued from the brothel by an older lover, only to encounter further tribulations.

Publication history
Bian er chai was written in classical Chinese by an anonymous writer using the pseudonym "The Moon-Heart Master of the Drunken West Lake", who is also believed to have written another homoerotic short story collection titled Yichun xiangzhi or Fragrance of the Pleasant Spring, as well as a preface for Cu hulu, a novella about a shrewish wife. Surviving editions of Bian er chai also contain interlinear commentary by "The Daoist Master Haha What Can You Do About Fate". The novel was first published during the reign of the Chongzhen Emperor (16281644) by the obscure "Plowing the Mountain with a Brush Studio", and was later banned by the Qing government. Two extant editions of Bian er chai are known to exist: one is housed at the Beijing Municipal Library and the Tenri Central Library in Japan, while the other is held in the National Palace Museum in Taipei.

Notes

References

Citations

Bibliography

 
 
 
 
 
 

fr: Épingle de femme sous le bonnet viril
zh: 弁而釵

17th-century Chinese novels
Censored books
Chinese erotic novels
LGBT short story collections
Ming dynasty literature
Works published under a pseudonym
Works of unknown authorship